This list of Catholic artists concerns artists known, at least in part, for their works of religious Catholic art.  It also includes artists whose position as a Roman Catholic priest or missionary was vital to their artistic works or development. It primarily features artists who did at least some of their artwork for Catholic churches, including Eastern Catholic Churches in communion with the Pope.

Note that this is not a list of all artists who have ever been members of the Catholic Church.  Further, seeing as many to most Western European artists from the 5th century to the Protestant Reformation did at least some Catholic religious art, this list will supplement by linking to lists of artists of those eras rather than focusing on names of those eras.

List

Romanesque artists 

Agnes II, Abbess of Quedlinburg, work includes miniatures and engravings; possibly Gothic period

Gothic artists 

Duccio, Maestà (1308–11), his masterpiece was for Siena's cathedral
Master Francke, German Gothic painter and Dominican friar
Giotto, Proto-Renaissance artist with many religious works; the best regarded perhaps is his Cappella degli Scrovegni in the Arena Chapel

Renaissance to Rococo 

Juan de la Abadía, Spanish painter in the Spanish-Flemish style; did works in churches and hermitages
Lambert-Sigisbert Adam, Nicolas-Sébastien Adam, and François Gaspard Adam, French sculptors and brothers; works include church sculptures
Fra Guglielmo Agnelli, Italian sculptor, architect, and lay brother; among the more noted artists for the Dominican Order
Angelica Veronica Airola, Baroque painter of religious works; became a nun
Francesco Albani, works include a Baptism of Christ and frescoes for Santa Maria della Pace
Cherubino Alberti, director of the Vatican authorized Accademia di San Luca who did work for chapels
Mariotto Albertinelli, Florentine school painter known for his depiction of The Visitation
Balthasar Augustin Albrecht, Bavarian painter partly known for an altar piece depicting the Assumption of Mary
Matteo Perez d'Aleccio, reportedly worked with Michelangelo on the Sistine Chapel
Martino Altomonte, works include Maria Immaculata and The Ascension of Mary
Fra Angelico, member of the Dominican Order and a beatified person
Antonio de Paz, sculptor noted for work in Salamanca's churches and its cathedral
Niccolò dell'Arca, works include Candlestick-holding Angel in the Arca di San Domenico
Alberto Arnoldi, 14th-century Italian architect and sculptor; significant to Florence Cathedral and the city's 14th-century art
Cosmas Damian Asam, German late Baroque/Rococo painter and architect, who worked with his brother Egid Quirin Asam in designing abbeys and churches of Germany
Egid Quirin Asam, German sculptor and plasterer of late Baroque/Rococo churches and monasteries primarily in Bavaria during the Counter-Reformation; his works include the high altar or figurative art in Weltenburg Abbey, Braunau in Rohr abbey, St. Peter church in Sandizell, Asamkirche in Munich, Fürstenfeld abbey, and the Freising Cathedral, among others  
Jean Denis Attiret, French Jesuit missionary who did paintings for the Cathedral of Avignon and was later honored by the Qianlong Emperor
Johann Baptist Babel, Swiss sculptor who did work for Einsiedeln Abbey and the Cathedral of Saint Ursus of Solothurn
Giovanni Baglione, works include frescoes in the vault of the nave of the Basilica di Santa Maria Maggiore
Roque Balduque, Flemish sculptor and maker of altarpieces; known for works from after he settled in Spain
Bartolommeo Bandinelli, did bas-reliefs in the choir of the cathedral of Florence
Barna da Siena, works include Christ Bearing the Cross, with a Dominican Friar
Federico Barocci, became a lay Capuchin and Counter-Reformation artist
Fra Bartolomeo, member of a Dominican Order; works include The Vision of St Bernard
Martino di Bartolomeo, fourteenth-century Italian painter and manuscript illuminator; works include Marian art, church frescoes, altar-pieces, and choirbooks
Pompeo Batoni, works include Return of the Prodigal Son
Giuseppe Bazzani, Italian Rococo painter whose religious works include the altarpiece of St Romuald's Vision
Gaspar Becerra, Spanish Renaissance sculptor and painter; much of his religious art has been destroyed by war
Giovanni Bellini, did Altarpiece with St Vincent Ferrar
Johann-Georg Bendl, Bohemian sculptor known for sculptures of saints and angels
Johann Georg Bergmüller, religious works include Allegory of the Catholic Church and Communion, drawings of Thomas Aquinas, church frescoes
Gian Lorenzo Bernini, Italian Baroque sculptor, architect, painter, impresario who served under six popes of Rome during the Counter-Reformation, inheriting the role of papal artist from his predecessor, Michelangelo; he was considered the greatest expositor of Roman Baroque sculpture, renowned for creating, among others, the Baldacchino and Cathedra Petri in St. Peter’s Basilica, the Jesuit church Sant’ Andrea al Quirinale in Rome, and the Ecstasy of Saint Teresa in Santa Maria della Vittoria
Alonso Berruguete, Spanish painter, sculptor, and architect noted for emotive sculptures depicting religious ecstasy or torment
Trophime Bigot, did a variety of altar-pieces, a depiction of the Assumption of the Virgin, depiction of Judith Beheading Holofernes, and paintings of saints
Fra Bonaventura Bisi, Franciscan friar who did religious works like Holy Family, with St. John and St. Elisabeth
Pedro Atanasio Bocanegra, did religious art at the cloister of Nuestra Senora de Gracia and the College of the Jesuits
Krzysztof Boguszewski, Polish Baroque painter and priest
Andrea Bolgi, did Saint Helena statue in St. Peter's Basilica
Boetius à Bolswert, copper-plate engraver who did emblems for the devotional book Pia Desideria and was a member of the Jesuit Sodality of Adult Bachelorhood
Orazio Borgianni, did religious art in San Silvestro in Capite, San Carlo alle Quattro Fontane, and elsewhere
Hieronymus Bosch, did Christ Crowned with Thorns, which hangs in the San Lorenzo monastery at El Escorial
Sandro Botticelli, Virgin and Child with an Angel and The Mystical Nativity are among his religious works; is believed to have become strongly moralistic in later life
Francesco Botticini, largely known for Marian paintings, such as Assumption of the Virgin
Valentin de Boulogne, did The Martyrdom of Martinian and Processus and altarpieces for the Holy See
Dieric Bouts, like many Early Netherlandish painters he did much religious work, such as The Entombment
Andrea Bregno, Italian Early Renaissance sculptor and architect who did religious sculptures and work on papal tombs
Charles Le Brun, French Baroque painter whose religious works include The Sleep of Jesus and L'Assomption de la Vierge
Filippo Brunelleschi, designer of the dome of the Florence Cathedral
Hannequin de Bruselas, Flemish architect and sculptor who worked as general contractor for Toledo Cathedral.
Miguel Cabrera, given access to Our Lady of Guadalupe for copies, wrote about the image in Maravilla Americana, and did religious themes
Guglielmo Caccia and Orsola Maddalena Caccia, father and daughter known for religious art
Melchiorre Cafà, Maltese sculptor active in Rome; works include Martyrdom of Saint Eustace, Virgin of the Rosary, and Ecstasy of Saint Catherine
Girolamo Campagna, Northern Italian sculptor who did sculptures of saints and work on altars
José Campeche, early Puerto Rican painter; although he also did portraits, his religious work is the most abundant of his known production
Bernardino Campi, works include Immaculée Conception
Robert Campin, like many Early Netherlandish painters, he did much religious art
Alonzo Cano, Spanish painter, architect, and sculptor known for religious art; also known for generosity, fierce temperament, and antisemitism
Battistello Caracciolo or "Battistello", Italian caravaggisti whose works include a depiction of the Liberation of Saint Peter for Pio Monte della Misericordia and the Immaculate Conception for the Santa Maria della Stella in Naples
Caravaggio, religious work includes The Martyrdom of Saint Matthew in the San Luigi dei Francesi
Carlo Carlone, Italian Rococo artist active in Germany whose works include The Glorification of Saints Felix and Adauctus for the church of San Felice del Benaco
Fra Carnevale, member of the Dominican Order; works include Christ on the Cross
The Carracci, relatives who all did at least some religious art
Juan Carreño de Miranda, noted as a court painter; also did works for convents and churches
Jaume Cascalls, 14th-century Catalan sculptor linked to works at the Church of St. Mary, Poblet Monastery, Santa Maria de Ripoll, Girona Cathedral, and others
Giuseppe Castiglione, sent to China as a missionary; also did wall paintings in Jesuit churches in Portugal and Macau
Catherine of Bologna, Italian nun, saint, and non-professional artist
Pasquale Cati, known for a depiction of the Matryrdom of Saint Lawrence and a depiction of the Council of Trent
Bartolomeo Cavaceppi, sculptor who did restoration work for the Vatican and became a Knight of the Golden Spur
Benvenuto Cellini, employed at the papal mint at Rome during the papacy of Pope Clement VII and later of Pope Paul III
Giuseppe Cesari, a favorite of Pope Clement VIII, his patron; partly known for religious art for churches
Petrus Christus, works include Portrait of a Carthusian
Agostino Ciampelli, trained in the studio of Santi di Tito; works include The Martyrdom of St. Clement I, Pope
Cimabue, works include a crucifix at Basilica di Santa Croce di Firenze
Matteo Civitali, noted sculptor and architect who built a chapel that the Holy Face of Lucca is in
Hendrick de Clerck, Flemish Baroque painter who did an altarpiece
Joos van Cleve, works include Man with the Rosary and Triptych of Saint Peter, Saint Paul and Saint Andrew
Giulio Clovio, Italian/Croatian Renaissance painter of Farnese Hours; works include The Towneley Lectionary
Claudio Coello, Spanish Baroque painter of Portuguese ancestry; worked at the court of Charles II and did much religious art
Niccolò Antonio Colantonio, largely known for the Delivery of the Franciscan Rule and works for churches
Sebastiano Conca, works include Christ at the Garden of Gesthemane, The Holy Family with the Infant Saint John the Baptist
Bartolomeo Coriolano, engraver whose major works include St Jerome in Meditation Before a Crucifix, Herodias with the Head of the Baptist, and The Virgin, with the Infant Sleeping; his daughter Theresa Maria Coriolano was also an engraver of religious works
Carlo Cornara, Jesuit who did work for the Basilica of Sant'Ambrogio
Antonio da Correggio, works include  Adoration of the Magi, Martyrdom of Four Saints, Assumption of the Virgin, and Mystic Marriage of Saint Catherine
Pietro da Cortona, Italian Baroque painter and architect who did church ceiling frescoes and church architecture
Manoel da Costa Ataíde, Brazilian Baroque painter known for painting the ceiling of the Church of Saint Francis of Assisi in Ouro Preto
Jacques Courtois (Jesuit), painted, in the Cistercian monastery, the Miracle of the Loaves
Wouter Crabeth I and Wouter Crabeth II, grandfather and grandson whose works include Catholic religious art
Caspar de Crayer, Flemish Baroque painter; works include  Martyrdom of St Blaise and  Centurion and Christ
Il Cerano, did paintings of the Quadroni of St. Charles
Carlo Crivelli, Italian Renaissance painter
Baldassare Croce, directed the Accademia di San Luca and did a "Passion cycle" for a basilica
Szymon Czechowicz, painted The Entombment, pieces depicting St. Stanislaus of Szczepanów, and works for churches
Baccio D'Agnolo, Italian wood-carver, sculptor, and architect whose works include the campanile of the church of Santo Spirito, Florence
Lluís Dalmau, 15th-century Catalan painter; works include Virgin of the Consellers
Fra Diamante, Carmelite friar who assisted Filippo Lippi and did religious frescoes at his convent
Jacopo di Mino del Pellicciaio, did a painting of the Coronation of the Virgin and aided Bartolo di Fredi on Siena Cathedral
Lovro Dobričević, 15th-century Croatian painter of altarpieces and church paintings
Marco d'Oggiono, pupil of Leonardo da Vinci; did frescoes for Santa Maria della Pace and others
Carlo Dolci, did paintings of saints and Biblical figures; also known for personal piety
Domenichino, religious art includes his Saint John the Evangelist and Adoration of the Shepherds,
Donatello, Italian Renaissance sculptor whose religious artworks include Saint Mark, The Feast of Herod, and Judith and Holofernes
François Duquesnoy, did statues for St. Peter's Basilica
Jerónimo Jacinto de Espinosa, Valencian Baroque painter; works include  :es:El milagro del Cristo del Rescate and :es:Comunión de la Magdalena
Fernando Estévez, Canarian known for the copy of the Virgin of Candelaria
Gentile da Fabriano, Italian painter whose best known works, like Adoration of the Magi, are religious
Nicolás Factor, Spanish Renaissance painter and beatified person
Cosimo Fanzago, Neapolitan Baroque architect and sculptor; religious works include churches and altars
Garcia Fernandes, Portuguese Renaissance painter of altarpieces and church art
Gregorio Fernández, Castilian school sculptor for altarpieces and "pasos procesionales"
Gaudenzio Ferrari, Renaissance painter and sculptor whose works were exclusively, or at least primarily, religious in nature
Ercole Ferrata, Italian Baroque sculptor whose works include The Death of St. Agnes and Angel with a Cross
Domenico Fetti, works include several of a religious nature, though much of his religious art was for private devotions
Joseph Anton Feuchtmayer, "house sculptor" for Salem Abbey
Juan de Flandes, Early Netherlandish painter active in Spain who concentrated on religious work after 1504
Bertholet Flemalle, works include Adoration of the Magi for the sacristy of a church of the Augustinians
Lavinia Fontana, did Saint Francis Receiving the Stigmata, (1579, Diocesan Seminary, Bologna) and work for Pope Paul V
Damià Forment or "Damian Forment", Spanish Renaissance sculptor known for cathedral work
Jean Fouquet, religious works include the Pieta of Nouans in the Church of Nouans-les-Fontaines
Piero della Francesca, religious works include The History of the True Cross, in the Basilica of San Francesco in Arezzo, and The Baptism of Christ
Bartolo di Fredi, works include an altarpiece in the Siena Cathedral and Presentation of Mary in the Temple
Agnolo Gaddi, religious works include a painting of the Coronation of the Virgin and frescoes in the choir of the Basilica of Santa Croce, Florence
Fede Galizia, works include an altarpiece for Saint Maria Maddalena Church and paintings related to the Book of Judith; primarily did still lifes
Bartolomeo della Gatta, Italian Camaldolese monk who did frescoes on the walls of the Sistine Chapel; later became an abbot
Bernardino Gatti, also called "il Sojaro"; did several religious works in Parma and Cremona, including an Assumption of Virgin for the Sanctuary of Santa Maria della Steccata
Giovanni Battista Gaulli, Jesuit noted for Triumph of the Name of Jesus on the ceiling of the Church of the Gesù
Geertgen tot Sint Jans, 15th-century painter from the Low Countries; works include Nativity at Night
Artemisia Gentileschi, works include Judith Beheading Holofernes, Virgin Mary and Baby with Rosary, and work with Pope Urban VIII
Antonio Gherardi, Italian Baroque painter, architect, and stuccoist who did work for many churches
Lorenzo Ghiberti, sculptor known for the north and east doors of the Florence Baptistery; the Gates of Paradise, and depictions of saints
Simone Ghini, Italian Renaissance sculptor who did work for popes
Domenico Ghirlandaio, work includes Vocation of the Apostles
Caterina Ginnasi, encouraged her uncle, Cardinal Domenico Ginnasi, to build a convent and did religious art for churches
Hugo van der Goes, joined the Congregation of Windesheim; many of his works are religious art
Nuno Gonçalves, forerunner of the Portuguese Renaissance; largely known for the Saint Vincent Panels
Benozzo Gozzoli, work includes frescoes in the Magi Chapel and paintings of saints and Mother Mary
Matthias Grünewald, German Catholic religious artist
Guercino, The Burial of St. Petronilla
Ignaz Günther, Bavarian Rococo sculptor and woodcarver best remembered for his work in churches
Matthäus Günther, German Baroque/Rococo artist who did frescoes for many churches and monasteries
Francisco Herrera the Elder and Francisco Herrera the Younger, Spanish Golden Age father and son who both did noted church paintings
Adriaen Isenbrandt, works include a depiction of the Mass of Saint Gregory and a triptych with the Assumption of Mary
Jan Janssens, Flemish Baroque painter and Ghent Caravaggisti whose works conformed to the Counter-Reformation
André Jean, member of the Dominican Order partly known for paintings depicting scenes in the New Testament
Jean Jouvenet, Magnificat in the choir of Notre-Dame
Martin Knoller, Austrian/Italian who painted frescoes for Neresheim Abbey, Ettal Abbey, and other abbeys, as well as altarpieces
Adam Kraft, known for work in cathedrals and churches
Giovanni Lanfranco, Italian Baroque painter who did much religious art and was honored by the Accademia di San Luca
Georges de La Tour, French Baroque painter whose works include Magdalen with the Smoking Flame
Francesco Laurana, Dalmatian/Italian sculptor and medallist whose religious art includes statues of saints and Mary
Tommaso Laureti, Noted work in Santa Susanna and a fresco series on a post-Council of Trent triumphalist theme for Pope Gregory XIII
Bernardo de Legarda, Quito School sculptor noted for Marian sculptures
Pierre Le Gros the Younger, sculptor of Religion Overthrowing Heresy and Hatred in Church of the Gesù and other religious art
Diego de Leyva, primarily produced religious art after retiring to a Carthusian monastery
Filippo Lippi, Carmelite who painted for a convent chapel at Prato; this led to an affair with Lucrezia Buti and to a son, Filippino Lippi
Filippino Lippi, his frescoes depicting the life of Philip the Apostle are in the Basilica di Santa Maria Novella
Alejandro de Loarte, painted a Miracle of the Loaves and Fishes (1622) for the Mission Friars; also did paintings of saints
Barbara Longhi, her devotional art is said to reflect the Counter-Reformation
Gregório Lopes, Portuguese painter, primarily a religious artist
Ambrogio Lorenzetti and Pietro Lorenzetti, brothers whose works include Presentation at the Temple and Madonna dei Tramonti
Claude Lorrain, although best known for landscape painting, also did religious art; his work is said to be influenced by the worldview of the Counter-Reformation
Lorenzo Lotto, became a Franciscan lay brother; religious art includes Recanati Annunciation and Recanati Polyptych
Bernardino Luini, a Leonardeschi; religious works include depictions of Mother Mary
Benedetto da Maiano and Giuliano da Maiano, Italian brothers who did a variety of religious sculpture and architecture
Juan Bautista Maíno, Spanish Baroque painter and Dominican friar who did work for the church of San Pedro Mártir among others
Jean Malouel, early Dutch painter of much religious art
Andrea Mantegna, The Lamentation over the Dead Christ
Carlo Maratta, works include Immaculate Conception; knighted in 1704 by Pope Clement XI
Juan Martínez Montañés, many of his works are religious in nature, as is common to the Sevillian school of sculpture
Simone Martini, died in the service of the Papal court at Avignon in 1344
Masaccio, works include Virgin and Child with St. Anne
Franz Anton Maulbertsch, Austrian Rococo painter who did ecclesiastical themes for many churches, including a Piarist Church in Vienna
Guido Mazzoni, Italian Renaissance sculptor noted for a depiction of the Lamentation of Christ (Compianta)
Pier Francesco Mazzucchelli, called "Il Morazzone"; has works in the Quadroni of St. Charles and painted altarpieces for many churches in Northern Italy
Hans Memling, Early Netherlandish artist; works include The Last Judgment and St. Ursula Shrine
Lippo Memmi, painter of Annunciation with St. Margaret and St. Ansanus
Pedro de Mena, Spanish sculptor for convents and cathedrals
Anton Raphael Mengs, Bohemian Neoclassical painter; after converting, painted religious works including The Glory of Saint Eusebius
Juan de Mesa, creator of several of the effigies that are used in the procession during the Holy Week in Seville
Antonello da Messina, works include Annunciation and Crucifixion
Domenico di Michelino, primarily Biblical and religious scenes
Michelangelo Buonarroti, Italian High Renaissance painter, architect, sculptor under the patronage of the popes of Rome during the reconstruction of St. Peter’s Basilica, from the Renaissance towards the early Counter-Reformation era; renowned for painting, among others, the Last Judgment and the Sistine Chapel ceiling
Michelozzo, did numerous statues of saints found at basilicas in Italy
Jan Miel, painted in the Roman church of Santa Maria dell'Anima for the chapel of San Lamberto and did other church art
Josef Ignaz Mildorfer, Austrian who primarily painted religious-themed altarpieces and frescoes on subjects like the Pentecost and the Assumption of Mary
Francesco Mochi, statue of Saint Veronica in St. Peter's Basilica
Gabriel Móger, Majorcan who did work on retables and altarpieces by the churches of Majorca
Lorenzo Monaco, Camaldolese painter who did a noted Predella
Pierre-Étienne Monnot, French Baroque sculptor who did work for the Archbasilica of St. John Lateran and the Santa Maria della Vittoria
Baccio and Raffaello da Montelupo, father and son whose work includes sculptures of saints and angels, made during the Italian Renaissance
Giovanni Angelo Montorsoli, Servite friar and sculptor who did a marble altarpiece of the Annunciation of Mary
Luis de Morales, Spanish painter of primarily religious subjects
Giovanni Maria Morlaiter, did most of the sculptures in Santa Maria del Rosario, a Dominican Order church
Bartolomé Esteban Murillo, best known for his Roman Catholic religious works
Girolamo Muziano, works include Resurrection of Lazarus led a team which did works on Church history
Tommaso Napoli, Sicilian Baroque architect of cathedrals and a member of the Dominican Order
Nicolau Nasoni, Italian architect and artist active in Portugal who did work for the Porto Cathedral, built the Clérigos Church, and did work for other churches
Juan Fernández Navarrete, deaf Spanish painter noted for his depictions of the Baptism of Christ, The Nativity, and Abraham
Pieter Neeffs I, Pieter Neeffs II, and Ludovicus Neefs, Flemish Baroque painters noted for depicting church interiors
Plautilla Nelli, nun and religious artist
Balthasar Neumann, German Rococo architect and military artillery engineer, renowned for designing the Würzburg Residence, the Gößweinstein Basilica of the Holy Trinity and the Basilica of the Fourteen Holy Helpers (Vierzehnheiligen) in Franconia, Germany among others
Giovanni Niccolo, Jesuit in Japan, known for works of Salvator Mundi and The Madonna
Dello di Niccolò Delli, Italian sculptor known for the apse cycle in the Old Cathedral, Salamanca
Josefa de Óbidos, one of the leading women Baroque painters; also did altarpieces
Vincenzo Onofri, Bolognese Renaissance sculptor of altars and a bust of Albertus Magnus, known for terracotta
Gilles-Marie Oppenordt, French designer and architect whose works include the chapel of St. John the Baptist in Amiens Cathedral
Bartolomé Ordóñez, Spanish Renaissance sculptor who did work for churches and tombs
Lorenzo Ottoni, best known for Counter-Reformation religious sculpture
Francisco Pacheco, painter who taught Diego Velázquez and felt artists' role was to "instill piety and to lead people to God"
Antonio Palomino, art writer and biographer who did a fresco for the sacristy of the Granada Charterhouse; became a priest after his wife's death
Giovanni di Paolo, Sienese School painter known for somewhat dreamlike religious art, such as Miracle of St. Nicholas of Tolentino
Parmigianino, works include Circumcision of Jesus, Vision of Saint Jerome, and Madonna with the Long Neck
Pietro Perugino, did Moses Leaving to Egypt, Baptism of Christ, and Delivery of the Keys at the Sistine Chapel
Baldassare Peruzzi, did ceiling decorations at the Vatican, and an altar at Siena
Francesco Pesellino, work includes a predella
Georg Petel, German sculptor; works include wood and ivory crucifixes, and a carved figure of Saint Christopher
Giovanni Battista Piazzetta, Italian Baroque/Rococo painter; works include  The Glory of St. Dominic and Assumption of The Virgin
Isabella Piccini, Catholic nun and engraver
Anton Pichler, Giovanni Pichler, and Luigi Pichler, family of gem engravers who did work for popes
Sano di Pietro, like many in the Sienese School, many of his works are religious in nature
Anton Pilgram, Austrian/German sculptor and architect who worked on cathedrals and altars
Pinturicchio, worked with several Popes and did frescoes for the Piccolomini Library adjoining Siena Cathedral
Sebastiano del Piombo, The Raising of Lazarus, and the altarpiece for Chigi Chapel
Pietro del Po, Giacomo del Po, and Teresa del Po, a father and two of his children who were members of the Accademia di San Luca and did religious art
Tobias Pock, Austrian/Swabian noted for Coronation of Virgin Mary and many paintings of saints found in churches
Antonio del Pollaiuolo and Piero del Pollaiuolo, brothers whose works include the Martyrdom of Saint Sebastian and work at the Basilica di San Lorenzo di Firenze
Pontormo, works include Annunciation, Madonna with Child and Saints, The Deposition from the Cross and St. Quentin
Nicolas Poussin, Baroque/Classical painter; works include Seven Sacraments
Andrea Pozzo, Jesuit brother known for the ceiling of Sant'Ignazio Church in Rome
Mattia Preti, Italian Baroque artist who did religious works in Naples and also in Malta, specifically St. John's Co-Cathedral
Scipione Pulzone, portrait artist whose religious works include Mater Divinae Providentiae, Our Lady of the Assumption, and Christ on the Cross with Saints
Enguerrand Quarton, 15th-century French artist of many religious paintings, including a rendition of the Coronation of the Virgin
Jacopo della Quercia, Italian Renaissance sculptor of altarpieces, statues of saints, and statues of Mother Mary
Diego Quispe Tito, Cuzco School painter of Virgin of Carmel Saving Souls in Purgatory and scenes of Christ
Ignác Raab, Czech Jesuit who did notable paintings of saints
Raffaellino del Colle, several works of Marian art
Antonio Raggi, Baroque sculptor from Ticino whose works include Death of Saint Cecilia, Baptism of Christ, and Angel with the Column
Ivan Ranger, monastic noted for paintings in churches, chapels, and monasteries
Raphael, Transfiguration is one of his religious works and is housed in the Pinacoteca Vaticana of Vatican City
Guido Reni - Italian Baroque painter of frescoes like St Dominic's Glory and paintings such as Assumption of Mary
Francisco Ribalta, Spanish Baroque painter
Jusepe de Ribera, Spanish/Neapolitan associated to Tenebrism; partly noted for depictions of martyrdom found in Neapolitan churches
Ricardo do Pilar, German/Brazilian monk whose paintings include Apparition of Our Lady to St. Bernard
Sebastiano Ricci, did a variety of works for Popes and did altarpieces
Giuliano da Rimini, known for altarpieces, a rendition of the Coronation of the Virgin, and possibly part of a Rimini school of painting
Jacopo Ripanda, known for frescoes in churches and Vatican palaces
Juan Rizi, Spanish Baroque painter who did paintings of saints; was made an Archbishop by Pope Clement X
Francesco Robba, Venetian Baroque sculptor and architect; did work for churches in Slovenia and Croatia
Luca della Robbia, sculptor whose works include The Nativity, circa 1460, and Madonna and Child, circa 1475
Pedro Roldán and Luisa Roldán, father and daughter who both did religious sculpture linked to the Sevillian school of sculpture
Antoniazzo Romano, Decoration of the Vatican Palace and frescoes in Santa Maria sopra Minerva
Paolo Romano, early Renaissance sculptor who worked for Popes and did a notable sculpture of Saint Paul
Cosimo Rosselli, works include Last Supper and Descent from Mount Sinai
Antonio and Bernardo Rossellino, brothers who did religious works for churches
Angelo de Rossi, did sculptures for Popes; is linked to the Accademia di San Luca
Peter Paul Rubens, Catholic convert; Flemish painter of Northern Baroque who produced numerous artworks of the Counter-Reformation and served under the patronage of the Habsburg rulers of Spain and Flanders; renowned for his works, among others, in Saint Bavo Cathedral and the Cathedral of Our Lady (Antwerp)
Camillo Rusconi, Italian late-Baroque sculptor whose masterpieces are said to be four sculptures of apostles (Matthew, James the Great, Andrew, and John)
Guillem Sagrera, Catalan sculptor and architect from Majorca; director of the works of the Perpignan Cathedral and others
Ventura Salimbeni, Sienese School artist whose works include Disputa of the Eucharist; became a Knight of the Golden Spur for his work in the Basilica of San Pietro
Francisco Salzillo, Spanish Baroque sculptor who did work for a Capuchin monastery in the Region of Murcia and churches in the area
Stanisław Samostrzelnik, Polish painter of frescoes in Catholic churches
Juan Sánchez Cotán, although best known for Bodegónes, he was a prolific religious painter and entered a Carthusian monastery
Andrea Sansovino, High Renaissance sculptor who did work for the Genoa Cathedral, the Santa Maria in Aracoeli, and the Basilica of Sant'Agostino
Jacopo Sansovino, the statue Madonna del Parto in the Basilica of Sant'Agostino; student of Andrea Sansovino
Basilio Santa Cruz Pumacallao, Cuzco School painter of A Franciscan Allegory of the Immaculate Virgin; supervised paintings of the Corpus Christi procession
Carlo Saraceni, Caravaggisti whose religious art includes an altarpiece in the Roman church of San Lorenzo in Lucina
Andrea del Sarto, work includes paintings for the Santissima Annunziata, Florence
Sassetta, like much of the Sienese School, he did religious art, including the Mystic Marriage of St. Francis
Giovanni Battista Salvi da Sassoferrato, work includes paintings of Mother Mary
Christoph Thomas Scheffler, Jesuit who did portraits of Jesuit astronomers and frescoes in St. Paulinus' and other churches
Martin Johann Schmidt, Austrian Baroque/Rococo painter who primarily painted devotional images
Martin Schongauer, engraver mostly known for religious works such as Christi Geburt and Maria im Rosenhag
Johann Paul Schor, worked on the Siena Cathedral
Gerard Seghers, Flemish Baroque painter and Caravaggisti whose works include an Adoration of the Magi in the Church of Our Lady, Bruges
Giacomo Serpotta, stuccoist from Palermo who did a great deal of his work for churches
Luca Signorelli, his masterpiece is considered to be his fresco of the Last Judgment (1499) in Orvieto Cathedral
Diego Siloe, a founding figure in the Granadan school of sculpture and a church architect
Gherardo Silvani, Italian architect and sculptor of the Baroque who did much work on the San Gaetano, Florence
Elisabetta Sirani, works include a painting in the Basilica di San Marino and an Assumption of the Virgin
Michael Sittow, Estonian trained in the Early Netherlandish painting style; did a mix of small devotional art and portraits
Claus Sluter, Dutch/French Renaissance Northern Renaissance sculptor noted for the Well of Moses
Leonello Spada, Caravaggisti whose paintings include St Dominic Burning the Books of the Heretics in the Basilica of San Domenico
Massimo Stanzione, Italian Baroque painter whose religious works include a depiction of The Assumption of the Virgin and one of Judith with the Head of Holofernes
Johann Baptist Straub and Philipp Jakob Straub, Baroque sculptors who did much church art
Bernardo Strozzi, a Capuchin for several years; works include Christ Giving the Keys of Heaven to St. Peter
Pierre Subleyras, religious art includes Saint John of Ávila and Marriage of St Catherine
Giovanni Francesco Susini, Florentine Mannerist sculptor who did some religious art
Carpoforo Tencalla, Swiss-Italian Baroque painter who did work in several churches and monasteries
Giovanni Battista Tiepolo, religious works include Pope St. Clement Adoring the Trinity, Institution of the Rosary, and The Immaculate Conception
Tintoretto, Venetian painter, who worked on Church commission for artworks; contributed Marriage at Cana to the Santa Maria della Salute
Benvenuto Tisi, sometimes called "Il Garofalo"; a great deal of his works are religious
Titian, the most represented artist in the Basilica di Santa Maria della Salute; served the Holy Roman Emperor Charles V from the Renaissance to the Counter-Reformation era; was at the Council of Trent
Santi di Tito, works include Vision of Saint Thomas Aquinas and Annunciation
Luis Tristán, Spanish Baroque painter; one of his most important paintings is an altar image in the church of Yepes
Paul Troger, did frescoes for several abbeys and also Apotheosis of Saint Ignatius in St. Ignatius’ church in Győr, Hungary
Paolo Uccello, works include Saint George and the Dragon, Nun-Saint with Two Children, and Life of the Holy Fathers
Andrea Vaccaro, Tenebrist style painter known for paintings of saints
Juan de Valdés Leal, works include The Assumption of the Virgin and Virgin of the Immaculate Conception with Sts Andrew and John the Baptist
Hubert van Eyck, worked on Ghent Altarpiece
Jan van Eyck, works include  Virgin and Child with Canon van der Paele, and work on the Ghent Altarpiece
Luis de Vargas, Spanish painter, influenced by Mannerism; painted altarpieces and other religious works in Seville; reportedly quite devout
Giorgio Vasari, An Allegory of the Immaculate Conception; a Knight of the Golden Spur; perhaps better known as a biographer
Gregorio Vasquez de Arce y Ceballos, most of his work is religious in nature
Juan Bautista Vázquez the Elder and Juan Bautista Vázquez the Younger, both sculpted Catholic religious art as did most in the Sevillian school of sculpture
Vecchietta, religious art in the Cappella del Sacro Chiodo and in varied churches
Diego Velázquez, portrait artist whose religious works include Christ in the House of Martha and Mary and Temptation of St. Thomas
Domenico Veneziano, Santa Lucia de' Magnoli Altarpiece
Giuseppe Vermiglio, Caravaggisti whose works are believed to include The Incredulity of St. Thomas, Crowning with Thorns / Mocking of Christ and Saint Jerome

Paolo Veronese, The Adoration of the Magi on the ceiling of the Capella del Rosario and The Wedding at Cana for San Giorgio Monastery
Leonardo da Vinci, The Last Supper at Santa Maria delle Grazie is perhaps his most famous religious work
Daniele da Volterra, known for his painting Descent from the Cross in the Trinità dei Monti and for being hired to cover the genitals in Michelangelo's The Last Judgment
Simon Vouet, works include Saint Jerome, The Conversion of the Magdalen, and The Virgin and Child
Johann Peter Alexander Wagner, Rococo sculptor of Stations of the Cross, a crucifix, and other religious art
Rogier van der Weyden, early Netherlandish painter of many works of religious art
Wu Li, Chinese landscape painter, poet, and member of the Society of Jesus
Fernando Yáñez de la Almedina, Spanish Renaissance art whose works were often religious 
Francisco Tito Yupanqui, known for Marian statues such as Virgin of Copacabana; there is an effort to have him beatified
Marcos Zapata, like many of the Cuzco School, his works dealt with religious subjects
Juan Zariñena, primarily religious painter from Valencia
Johann Jakob Zeiller, Austrian known for religious frescoes like those at Aldersbach Abbey in Fürstenzell and the Ettal Abbey
Januarius Zick, German architect and painter of the Late Baroque who did art for various monasteries and churches

Giuseppe Zimbalo, Leccesi architect and sculptor; did the façade of the Basilica of Santa Croce
Dominikus Zimmermann and Johann Baptist Zimmermann, German brothers who did church architecture, stucco, and painting
Francisco de Zurbarán, works include the great altarpiece of St. Thomas Aquinas, Immaculate Conception, and paintings of Carthusians
Federico Zuccari, Pauline chapel of the Vatican and The Last Judgment inside the dome of the Florence Cathedral

Nineteenth century to present
Ephraim Francis Baldwin, designed St. Leo's Church and won a Benemerenti medal for his work on The Catholic University of America
Cajetan J. B. Baumann, Franciscan friar and church architect
Ade Bethune, liturgical artist linked to the Catholic Worker Movement
Jean-Baptiste Bethune, called by some the "Pugin of Belgium"; founder of the Catholic Gild de St. Thomas et de St. Luc
Gilbert R. Blount, English Catholic architect of St Mary Magdalen's Church in Brighton
Giuseppe Calì, Maltese painter who did paintings for many churches
Antonio Castillo Lastrucci, Andalusian sculptor known for religious works in the Cathedral of St Mary of the Assumption in Ceuta, around Seville, and elsewhere
Eduardo Castrillo, Filipino sculptor noted partly for religious art including a depiction of Saint Pedro Calungsod
Paul Cézanne, Post-Impressionist whose early works include some religious art such as Christ in Limbo
Albert Chmielowski, saint; founder of the Albertine Brothers, who did art, such as a depiction of Ecce homo, before taking up the religious life and serving the poor
Antonio Ciseri, nineteenth-century religious artist originally from Ticino; works include Ecce Homo and The Transport of Christ to the Sepulcher
Philip Lindsey Clark, works include a Stations of the Cross sculpture; after 1930 "all his RA exhibits were of religious and often specifically Catholic subjects;" became a Carmelite Tertiary
John Collier, convert, sculptor of Catholic memorial at Ground Zero in  New York City

James Collinson
William Congdon, after his conversion in 1959 he began his Crocefissi (Crucifixion) series
João Zeferino da Costa, Brazilian painter of panels in the Candelária Church
Marie-Alain Couturier (Dominican friar), stained glass and sacred art in modern form
Luigi Crosio, painted the Refugium Peccatorum Madonna
Salvador Dalí, created numerous large-scale religious compositions starting around the time of his repatriation in Spain
Sylvia Daoust, did work for Mary, Queen of the World, Cathedral; most of her work is religious
Anne Davidson, known for secular sculpture; religious works include Saint Margaret of Scotland and Resurrection; belonged to the Society of Catholic Artists
Maurice Denis, artist linked to Les Nabis; afterward he joined a third order and did religious art
Jan Henryk de Rosen, convert with works displayed at the Basilica of the National Shrine of the Immaculate Conception and elsewhere
Melchior Paul von Deschwanden, 19th-century Swiss painter primarily known for Catholic religious art
Czesław Dźwigaj, monuments to Pope John Paul II
Joseph-Hugues Fabisch, famous for The Virgin of Lourdes, which caused controversy as St. Bernadette Soubirous did not approve
Thomasita Fessler, nun who designed stained glass windows and founded the art department at Cardinal Stritch University
Jean-Hippolyte Flandrin, works include St. Clare Healing the Blind and other art for churches
Arthur Fleischmann, works include sculptures of popes and a Tryptych of the Holy Rosary for Westminster Cathedral
Moira Forsyth, stained glass artist; former President of the Society of Catholic Artists; works appear in Catholic and Anglican churches
Tsuguharu Foujita, designer and fresco painter of Foujita Chapel on Mumm's estate, Reims, France
Michael Sigismund Frank, glass painter and Catholic artist
Ernst Fuchs, a founder of the Vienna School of Fantastic Realism; converted to Catholicism; did the cycle Mysteries of the Holy Rosary
Yasutake Funakoshi, Japanese convert who did sculptures of the Twenty-six Martyrs of Japan and was honored by a Pope
Antoni Gaudí, architect of Sagrada Família (there are efforts to have him beatified)
Gregory Gerrer, Benedictine priest; did a portrait of Pope Pius X; co-founded the Association of Oklahoma Artists
James Gillick, contemporary English painter of ecclesiastical works such as the altarpiece at St. Neots, Cambridgeshire and the reredos at SS Gregory and Augustine's
George Goldie, specialized in Catholic churches, including St. Ignatius Church, Wishaw
Félix Granda, priest, sculptor, metalsmith, craftsman, and founder of the liturgical art workshop Talleres de Arte
Matthew Ellison Hadfield, English architect noted for Gothic Revival churches like Salford Cathedral and St Vincent's Church in Sheffield
Joseph Hansom, English architect who worked on Arundel Cathedral and other Catholic churches
William Laurel Harris, convert who did murals for the Paulist Fathers
John Rogers Herbert, his conversion is significant to his artistic history; most of his post-conversion art is religious
John Hogan, Irish sculptor of The Dead Christ
Evie Hone, spent time in an Anglican convent; after converting to Catholicism she did stained glass works for Catholic churches
Maria Innocentia Hummel, nun and artist known for figurines, but whose suffering under Nazi rule lead her to do the work The Stations of the Cross
Mary Concepta Lynch (1874 – 1939), was an Irish nun and skilled calligrapher, decorated Dominican Oratory in Dublin.
Berthold Imhoff, Knight of St. Gregory the Great known for his religious murals and paintings
Franz Ittenbach, German artist and member of the Nazarene movement
Louis Janmot, French religious painter and poet

Gwen John, Welsh artist; after converting, did religious art for a convent
David Jones, convert whose works include Sanctus Christus de Capel-y-ffin; better known as a poet
Patrick Keely, architect of numerous churches such as St. Mary's Church Complex
Adam Kossowski, former gulag inmate and a religious artist who joined the Guild of Catholic Artists and Craftsmen in 1944
William Kurelek, convert from Orthodoxy noted for paintings of Christ
Desiderius Lenz, Jan Verkade, and Gabriel Wuger, Benedictines belonging to the largely religious Beuron Art School
Leandro Locsin, architect of the Church of the Holy Sacrifice
Maurice Loriaux, founder of Santa Fé Studios of Church Art; ecclesiologist
Fred McCarthy, Secular Franciscan Order member best known as the cartoonist of Brother Jupiter; also did religious paintings
Charles Donagh Maginnis, Catholic church architect
Friedrich Wilhelm Mengelberg, German-Dutch convert whose works include church interiors and religious sculpture
Ivan Meštrović, Croatian religious sculptor; works include St. Jerome the Priest
Rudolf Moroder-Lenèrt, painter; did primarily religious sculpture, including a Stations of the Cross for the Church of St. Ann in Silesia and a sculpture of St. Elizabeth of Hungary for the Exposition Universelle in 1900
Rosemarie Morris, OP, bronze sculptor
Antonio Moscheni, Jesuit painter known for painting at the chapel; St. Aloysius College (Mangalore)
Esther Newport, member of the Sisters of Providence of Saint Mary-of-the-Woods; founded the Catholic Art Association
Guido Nincheri, artist for Catholic churches in Canada; Pope Pius XI named him Knight-Commander of the Order of Saint-Sylvester
Erik Olson, Swedish convert; painted a triptych in 1977 for the Vatican Museum in Rome
Francis Petre, Catholic architect of cathedrals in New Zealand
Edith Pfau, nun known for the works Risen Christ, Stations of the Cross and Madonna and Child
Jože Plečnik, Slovene architect who built Church of the Most Sacred Heart of Our Lord
Alois Plum, praised by Cardinal Karl Lehmann for his church art
Thomas Henry Poole, British-born architect of St. Catherine of Genoa's Church and other churches in the New York City area
Augustus Pugin, Catholic convert and noted architect; did the interior of St Chad's Cathedral in Birmingham; designed Erdington Abbey
E. W. Pugin and Peter Paul Pugin, sons of Augustus and church architects in their own right
Luis Ramacciotti, known for a sculpture of Christ in La Cumbre, Argentina
Georges Rouault, noted for paintings of Christ; a friend to Catholic philosopher Jacques Maritain
Tito Sarrocchi, did façades for the Basilica of Santa Croce, Florence
Friedrich Wilhelm Schadow, convert; like many others in the Nazarene movement, produced Catholic art
Steven Schloeder, contemporary architect, theologian, and author
Francis C. Schroen, Jesuit brother and church architect
Alexander Maximilian Seitz, did paintings of Christ and saints
Gino Severini, associated with Futurism and did church mosaics
Joseph Sibbel, German/American sculptor; works include Stations of the Cross, Doctor of the Church, and a marble statue representing Purgatory
Etsuro Sotoo, sculptor with Sagrada Família
Mary Stanisia, member of the School Sisters of Notre Dame who did paintings for the Roman Catholic Diocese of Fort Wayne-South Bend
Giovanni Strazza, known for The Veiled Virgin, which was delivered to Bishop John T. Mullock
Imogen Stuart, contemporary convert known for a monument to Pope John Paul II at St Patrick's College, Maynooth and works at Mary Immaculate College
Jan Styka, Polish artist known in part for his large depiction of the Crucifixion of Jesus
Pietro Tenerani, works include a relief of the Descent from the Cross and a colossal statue of St. Alphonsus Maria de Liguori; commissioned for the Tomb of Pope Pius VIII
Włodzimierz Tetmajer, Polish artist; specialized in religious themes; has works in Our Lady of the Angels’ Basilica
James Tissot, after a reconversion he did works like Crucifixion, seen from the Cross, which were part of a series called The Life of Jesus Christ
Jean Baptiste van Eycken, Belgian painter of works for the Église de la Chapelle
Adrian Wewer, Franciscan friar and architect of churches, seminaries, friaries, and convents
Paul Woodroffe, book illustrator and stained glass artist for chapels and churches

See also
 Baroque
 Early Netherlandish painting
 List of illuminated manuscripts
 Lists of Roman Catholics
 Marian art in the Catholic Church
 Roman Catholic art
 Silent preaching
 Spanish Golden Age

References

External links 
 

 
Artists
Catholic Church Artists